Sasamorpha is a genus of East Asian bamboo in the grass family.

Species
 Sasamorpha borealis (Hack.) Nakai – Korea, Japan, Sakhalin
 Sasamorpha hubeiensis C.H.Hu – Hubei, Jiangxi
 Sasamorpha oshidensis (Makino & Uchida) Nakai – Japan
 Sasamorpha qingyuanensis C.H.Hu – Zhejiang
 Sasamorpha sinica (Keng) Koidz. – Anhui, Zhejiang

Formerly included
several species now considered better suited to other genera: Indocalamus, Sasa.

References

Bambusoideae
Bambusoideae genera